{{Infobox airport 
| name            = Torreón International Airport
| nativename      = 
| image           = Aeropuerto torreon.jpg
| image-width     = 250
| caption         = 
| IATA            = TRC
| ICAO            = MMTC
| type            = Military/Public
| owner           = 
| operator        = Grupo Aeroportuario Centro Norte
| city-served     = Comarca Lagunera, e.g.:<ul>Torreón, CoahuilaGómez Palacio, Durango
| location        = Torreón, Coahuila, Mexico
| metric-elev     = 
| elevation-f     = 3688
| elevation-m     = 1124
| coordinates     = 
| website         = 
| pushpin_map     = Mexico Coahuila#Mexico#North America
| pushpin_relief  = yes
| pushpin_mapsize = 250
| pushpin_label   = TRC
| metric-rwy      = yes
| r1-number       = 08/26
| r1-length-f     = 4,813
| r1-length-m     = 1,467
| r1-surface      = Asphalt
| r2-number       = 13/31
| r2-length-f     = 9,039
| r2-length-m     = 2,755
| r2-surface      = Asphalt
| stat-year       = 2022
| stat1-header    = Total passengers
| stat1-data      = 495,602
| footnotes       = Source: Grupo Aeroportuario Centro Norte.
}}

Francisco Sarabia International Airport, also known as Torreón International Airport, is an international airport located in Torreón, Coahuila, Mexico. It handles the national and international air traffic of the Comarca Lagunera, including Gómez Palacio and Lerdo in the state of Durango.

The management of this airport is the responsibility of Grupo Aeroportuario Centro Norte (OMA). Passenger traffic has grown over 25% during the last decade. As a result, the airport terminal has recently been expanded and refurbished to significantly improve its image and services: new areas of documentation, a second floor for boarding gates and waiting areas, a VIP lounge and new, multi-purpose business areas.

It handled 320,820 passengers in 2020, and 537,161 passengers in 2021.

Airlines and destinations

Passengers

Cargo

Statistics

Passengers

Top destinations

Gallery

See also

List of the busiest airports in Mexico

References

External links

Airports in Coahuila
Buildings and structures in Coahuila
Transportation in Coahuila
Torreón